Youngshin Girls' High School is a private high school in Suwon, Gyeonggi Province.

History
Youngshin Girls' High School was founded on November 29, 1974. It was then established on March 7, 1975, on the same day as the school's first entrance ceremony. Current principal Jang Gyeong-ae was appointed on March 1, 2013 as the 10th principal. As of February 2, 2015, there are a total of 17,215 graduates.

References

External links
Official website

Schools in Gyeonggi Province
High schools in South Korea
Girls' schools in South Korea
Educational institutions established in 1974